L'Islet  was a federal electoral district in Quebec, Canada, that was represented in the House of Commons of Canada from 1867 to 1935.

It was created by the British North America Act, 1867 and consisted of the County of L'Islet. It was amalgamated into the Kamouraska and Montmagny—L'Islet electoral districts in 1933.

Members of Parliament

This riding elected the following Members of Parliament:

Election results

By-election: On Mr. Pouliot being unseated on petition

By-election: On Mr. Desjardin's resignation, 30 September 1892

By-election: On Mr. Déchêne being called to the Senate, 13 May 1901

See also 

 List of Canadian federal electoral districts
 Past Canadian electoral districts

External links
Riding history from the Library of Parliament

Former federal electoral districts of Quebec